1 vs. 100 is a BBC National Lottery game show based on the original Dutch version called Eén tegen 100. It aired on BBC One from 30 September 2006 to 23 May 2009, with Dermot O'Leary hosting the first two series and Ben Shephard hosting the last two series.

Format
One player is selected to play the game as The One against 100 people, collectively known as The 100. To win the game outright, the One must eliminate all members of the 100 by answering a series of questions correctly.

After having the opportunity to select one of two categories, a multiple-choice question with three options is revealed. The 100 is given six seconds to lock in their answers before the One is given the opportunity to answer the question. If the One is correct, any members of the 100 that answered the question incorrectly are eliminated from further play, bringing the lone contestant closer to winning the game. The amount of money in the contestant's bank also increases by £1,000 for each member of the 100 that are eliminated in that question. If the contestant eliminates all 100 opponents, they claim all the money in the bank plus an extra £50,000 for defeating them. However, if the One incorrectly answers a question, the game ends and they leave with nothing. Unlike other editions, such as the American version of the same name, if the One loses the game, the remaining players in the 100 will not share the money accumulated by the One. Also, the One cannot walk away with the money they have accumulated in the game until the 100 is defeated.

At the end of the game, during the last question of gameplay, the host will announce when the last members of the 100 have been eliminated before revealing if the One has answered correctly. They will then be given an offer to bail out by refusing to answer their final question, thus taking home the money that is already in the prize fund (including the payoff for that question) but the One will not collect the £50,000 for defeating the 100. If they refuse to bail and decide to play, and the contestants' answer is correct, then they take home all the money plus the £50,000, but if the answer is incorrect then they leave with nothing.

During gameplay, The One has three "Dodges", where if they do not know an answer to a question, they can refuse to answer the question and play their "Dodge", but their accumulated money amount is halved. When the One has eliminated 75 opponents, they are given an opportunity to earn another dodge through the "Bonus Dodge" category, but they cannot play a Dodge on that question. In addition, after the first question, the One can also use their "Double" to earn £2,000 for each member of the 100 eliminated if the One answers the question correctly. The maximum amount of money a contestant can win is £250,000 if all 100 people are eliminated on a question using the double without bailing out.

Transmissions

References

External links
 
 
 

2006 British television series debuts
2009 British television series endings
2000s British game shows
1 vs. 100
BBC television game shows
British game shows about lotteries
British television series based on Dutch television series
Television series by Banijay